Jura Dolois Football (commonly referred to as Jura Dolois) is a French football club based in Dole in the Franche-Comté region. The club was founded in 1991 under the name Dole-Tavaux Racing Club following the merger of local clubs FC Dole, which was formed in 1907, and US Tavaux-Damparis, which was formed in 1932. The club adopted its current name in 2006 and receiving backing and support from the commune Dole and its surrounding areas. Jura Dolois share a partnership with nearby professional club Dijon FCO. The club currently plays in the Championnat National 3, the fifth division of French football, after achieving promotion from the Division d'Honneur most recently in the 2016–17 season.

Current squad
As of 20 March 2019.

References

External links
 Official site

Association football clubs established in 1991
1991 establishments in France
Sport in Jura (department)
Football clubs in Bourgogne-Franche-Comté